Kateh-ye Shast-e Abadan-e Chahardeh (also Romanized as Kateh-ye Shaşt Ābādān-e Chahārdeh; also known as Katshaşt-e Ābādān) is a village in Chahardeh Rural District, in the Central District of Astaneh-ye Ashrafiyeh County, Gilan Province, Iran. At the 2006 census, its population was 387, in 130 families.

References 

Populated places in Astaneh-ye Ashrafiyeh County